I Believe to My Soul may refer to:

 I Believe to My Soul (song), a song by Ray Charles
 I Believe to My Soul (album), an album by Junior Mance
 I Believe to My Soul - The Best of 1977-2003'', a compilation album by Joe Camilleri